Tristan Alexander Farnon is an American webcomic author, creator of comic strip Leisure Town, the Silent Key podcast and Spigot.  He is one of the founding creators of the Microsoft Comic Chat-based webcomic Jerkcity, now known as Bonequest.

Leisure Town
Leisure Town features photographs of bendable toy figures digitally superimposed onto separately photographed backgrounds to create each frame.  While the "characters" are children's toys, the comics explore mature themes.  The strip ran from 1997 to 2003 (although in a reduced format from 2001 to 2003); some limited additional content was published in what appears to have been a one-time event in 2005.  The strip is still being published on the Internet, but no new content has been published since 2005.

Leisure Town gained some notoriety in 1997 when Farnon scanned Dilbert strips and changed the dialogue to become profane (the story was that a giraffe became irate in his office job and started creating the strips). Dilbert's lawyers came calling and the characters were replaced with stick figures; Farnon then reverted to the Dilbert versions, until the lawyers called again. The original Dilbert comics were restored a second time when the site was relaunched in March 2005.  During this period, however, the modified Dilbert strips had been mirrored by a number of other websites under the name The Dilbert Hole ; oddly, these mirrors did not attract the legal interference that Leisure Town had and a number of them continue to operate to the present day.

In 2002, Farnon discussed Leisure Town on CNN's NEXT@CNN show. CNN described Leisure Town as a "quirky, some would say twisted, photo comic [which was] nominated for a Webby Award two years ago, and has developed a cult following." Farnon described the financial difficulties of creating webcomics, saying "If I can support myself doing Leisure Town, I will be very surprised. You realize that when you make online comics, you're sort of folding up your product into a paper airplane and sailing it out the window, and who knows who's going to catch it."

Silent Key
The irregularly published Silent Key podcast consists of modern ham radio recordings of varying length presented without interruption or commentary. Farnon describes the collection as possessing "incalculable sadness and substantial humor in equal measure."

In the hobby of amateur radio, a silent key refers to an operator who is deceased.

References

 Crane, Jordan (April 2001). A Silly Little Coat Hanger for Fart Jokes: Talkin' Comics with Leisuretown.com's Tristan A Farnon. The Comics Journal, no. 232. Pg. 80-89
 Hattori, James (February 2, 2002). "NEXT@CNN 13:00". CNN, Transcript #020200CN.V30
 Pearson, Kali (January 19, 2002). "Net buskers have lots of freedom". The Gazette (Montreal, Quebec), Pg. W7.

External links
 Leisure Town
 BoneQuest
 Gaping Maw
 Silent Key
 Silent Key Podcast on iTunes
 The Comics Journal: interview

American comic strip cartoonists
American webcomic creators
Living people
Year of birth missing (living people)